The Hurwitz quaternion order is a specific order in a quaternion algebra over a suitable number field.  The order is of particular importance in Riemann surface theory, in connection with surfaces with maximal symmetry, namely the Hurwitz surfaces.  The Hurwitz quaternion order was studied in 1967 by Goro Shimura, but first explicitly described by Noam Elkies in 1998.  For an alternative use of the term, see Hurwitz quaternion (both usages are current in the literature).

Definition
Let  be the maximal real subfield of  where  is a 7th-primitive root of unity. 
Let  be the quaternion algebra, or symbol algebra 

Let 

Module structure
The order  is also generated by elements

and

In fact, the order is a free -module over
the basis .  Here the generators satisfy the relations

which descend to the appropriate relations in the (2,3,7) triangle group, after quotienting by the center.

Principal congruence subgroups
The principal congruence subgroup defined by an ideal  is by definition the group

mod 

namely, the group of elements of reduced norm 1 in  equivalent to 1 modulo the ideal .  The corresponding Fuchsian group is obtained as the image of the principal congruence subgroup under a representation to PSL(2,R).

Application
The order was used by Katz, Schaps, and Vishne to construct a family of Hurwitz surfaces satisfying an asymptotic lower bound for the systole:  where g is the genus, improving an earlier result of Peter Buser and Peter Sarnak; see systoles of surfaces.

See also
(2,3,7) triangle group
Klein quartic
Macbeath surface
First Hurwitz triplet

References

Riemann surfaces
Differential geometry of surfaces
Algebras
Algebra
Systolic geometry